Miguel Ángel Gómez Palapa (born 6 September 1974 in Mexico City) is a former Mexican professional football midfielder.

Career
Gómez Palapa started his youth career at Cruz Azul Hidalgo. In 2000, he was promoted to the senior club, Cruz Azul, where he played until 2003. Later he moved to León and to Chiapas's farm team Jaguares de Tapachula. From 2004 until his retirement in 2007 he played for Chiapas. Afterwards, he worked for Chiapas as manager of youth categories of the club, until its dissolution in June 2017.

Before joining Cruz Azul, Gómez Palapa was studying a B. A. in Graphic Design, which he dropped to focus on his career as professional footballer.

References

1974 births
Living people
Mexican footballers
Association football midfielders
Cruz Azul footballers
Club León footballers
Chiapas F.C. footballers
Liga MX players
Footballers from Mexico City